Angel Deradoorian (born July 18, 1986), also known mononymously as Deradoorian, is a musician based in Los Angeles, California. She is best known for her work with Dirty Projectors as full-time member from 2007 to 2012. She left to pursue a solo career. In 2015 she released a solo studio album, The Expanding Flower Planet.

Life and career
Born and raised in Orangevale, California and of Armenian descent, Deradoorian first found an interest in music at the age of five, when she was taught violin and piano at the private school she attended. Both her parents are artists and she has an older sister Arlene, who also tours with her performing solo material. At the age of 16 she decided to leave school and pursue a career in music. She moved to Brooklyn, joined Drive-thru Records band An Angle and then shortly after in 2007 she joined Dirty Projectors and played an important role in the recording of the album Bitte Orca. In 2012, she moved to Los Angeles together with her then-boyfriend Avey Tare.

Deradoorian's debut EP, Mind Raft, was released under her surname in 2009 by Lovepump United Records. In 2009, she recorded a track with Vampire Weekend keyboardist Rostam Batmanglij and Ra Ra Riot vocalist Wes Miles on their Discovery album LP. The track is entitled "I Wanna Be Your Boyfriend". Animal Collective chose her to perform at the All Tomorrow's Parties festival that they curated in 2011. In 2011, she released a split 7-inch with Albert McCloud containing a song by McCloud entitled "Planetarium 2010" and her own song "Marichka". She was a member of Avey Tare's project, Slasher Flicks, along with ex-Ponytail drummer Jeremy Hyman, and released the album Enter the Slasher House in 2014.

In 2015, Deradoorian released her debut solo studio album, The Expanding Flower Planet, on Anticon. In 2017, she released an EP titled Eternal Recurrence, which mixes obscure and ambient landscapes. Her second full-length solo album, Find the Sun, was released on September 18, 2020, by record label Anti-.

In 2022, Deradoorian and Russian musician Kate NV formed the band Decisive Pink, being signed to Fire Records.

Discography

Studio albums
 The Expanding Flower Planet (2015)
 Find the Sun (2020)

Compilation albums
 Disembodied Improvisations Vol. 1 (2019)

EPs
 Mind Raft (2009)
 Eternal Recurrence (2017)

Singles
 "Marichka" b/w "Planetarium 2010" (2011) 
 "Mountainside" (2017)

Guest appearances
 Discovery – "I Wanna Be Your Boyfriend" from LP (2009)
 The Roots – "A Peace of Light" from How I Got Over (2010)
 U2 –  "Ordinary Love" from Songs of Innocence  (2013)
 U2 – "The Troubles" from Songs of Innocence deluxe edition (2014) 
 Flying Lotus – "Siren Song" from You're Dead! (2014)
 Avey Tare’s Slasher Flicks – Enter the Slasher House (2014)
 Brandon Flowers – "Dreams Come True", "Can't Deny My Love", "Still Want You", "Between Me And You", and "Diggin' Up The Heart" from The Desired Effect (2015)
 Boots – "Aquaria" from Aquaria (2015)
 Hamilton Leithauser + Rostam – "1959" from I Had a Dream That You Were Mine (2016)
 Avey Tare – Eucalyptus (2017)
 Rostam – "Hold You" from ''Half-Light (2017)
 Boots – "Language" (2020)

References

External links

 
 

Living people
1986 births
Place of birth missing (living people)
American people of Armenian descent
Musicians from Brooklyn
American women singer-songwriters
Women bass guitarists
American rock bass guitarists
21st-century American bass guitarists
Singer-songwriters from New York (state)
Guitarists from New York (state)
Dirty Projectors members
21st-century American singers
21st-century American women singers
21st-century American women musicians
Anticon artists
Anti- (record label) artists